Unforgotten is a British crime drama television series, which initially aired on ITV on 8 October 2015. It was created and written by Chris Lang and directed by Andy Wilson. The programme follows a team of London detectives led by DCI Cassie Stuart (Nicola Walker) (Series 1–4), DCI Jess James (Sinéad Keenan) (Series 5) and DI Sunny Khan (Sanjeev Bhaskar) as they solve cold cases of disappearance and murder.

Each series consists of six episodes. Series 1 to 4 were broadcast in the UK in 2015, 2017, 2018 and 2021. On 30 March 2021 a fifth series was announced, scheduled for release in 2023, and it was confirmed that Sanjeev Bhaskar would reprise his role. A year later it was confirmed that Sinéad Keenan would replace Walker as Bhaskar's new partner, DCI Jessica "Jessie" James. Filming for the fifth series began on 14 March 2022. The first episode of series 5 premiered on ITV in February 2023.

Each series deals with a new case, introducing seemingly unconnected characters who are gradually revealed to have some relationship with the victim. As the murder mystery unfolds, the emotional ramifications of the crime on the lives of those affected are also explored.

Unforgotten has received critical acclaim. Tom Courtenay won the 2016 BAFTA TV Award for Best Supporting Actor for the first series and Mark Bonnar won the 2017 BAFTA Scotland for Best Actor in Television for the second series.

Plots

Plots of each series
Series 1 focuses on the murder of James "Jimmy" Sullivan (Harley Alexander-Sule), a 17-year-old who disappeared in 1976. His remains are discovered during the demolition of a house in North London.

Series 2 follows the murder of David Walker (Daniel Gosling), a Conservative Party consultant who went missing in 1990. His saponified remains are found in a suitcase in the River Lea in north-east London.

Series 3 investigates the murder of schoolgirl Hayley Reid (Bronagh Waugh), who disappeared from a seaside resort town on New Year's Eve 1999. Her skeleton is discovered by workmen repairing the central reservation of the M1 motorway in London.

Series 4 follows the discovery in 2020 of Matthew Walsh's headless and handless corpse, apparently frozen since his disappearance in 1990 when he encountered five police trainees celebrating their graduation from the academy.

Plots and themes spanning series
Series 1 to 4 include the story of DCI Cassie Stuart's personal life: of the typical but growing conflicts in her immediate family, of her spartan arms-length relationships with individuals who like her, of her drive to solve cases and of her coping both successfully and unsuccessfully with the relentless strain of her job. During the historical cold cases Cassie verbalizes her driving motives: find the truth of what happened, provide closure to the living and possibly bring a criminal to justice. An inner motive surfaces when she says she hopes solving a current case will help "... [me] move on... If we can do this right, if we can ignore who they are and do it by the book, then all the questions [and faces] might all go away. And I might be able to sleep at night."

Cast
Nicola Walker as DCI Cassandra 'Cassie' Stuart (series 1–4)
Sanjeev Bhaskar as DI Sunil 'Sunny' Khan 
Sinéad Keenan as DCI Jessica 'Jessie' James (series 5)
Jordan Long as DS Murray Boulting
Lewis Reeves as DC Jake Collier (series 1-4)
Pippa Nixon as DC Karen 'Kaz' Willetts (series 1, 4-present)
Peter Egan as Martin Hughes, DCI Stuart's father (series 1–4)
Jassa Ahluwalia as Adam Stuart, DCI Stuart's son (series 1–4)
Colin R. Campbell as DSI Clive Andrews, DCI Stuart's boss
Carolina Main as DC Fran Lingley (series 2–present)
Alastair MacKenzie as ex-DCI John Bentley and later Cassie's partner (series 3–4)
Georgia Mackenzie as Leanne Balcombe, pathologist (series 3–present)
Michelle Bonnard as Sally Fields, Sunny's partner (series 3–present)
Janet Dibley as Jenny, Martin's partner (series 3–4)
Andrew Lancel as Steve James, DCI James’ husband 
Kate Robbins as Kate, DCI James’ mother

Series 1 (2015) cast

Series 2 (2017) cast

Series 3 (2018) cast

Series 4 (2021) cast

Series 5 (2023) cast

Production
The series was originally developed, by Lang, as a serial titled 27 Arlington Crescent. Filming for the first series began in March 2015 and lasted for twelve weeks. Locations included Liverpool, the London suburbs, Kingston upon Thames, the Essex coast, Westminster and the Fens.

After the unexpected success of the initial series, ITV commissioned a second series, with Lang returning as writer and Wilson as director. It was shot on location by the River Lea, in the Cotswolds, and along the promenade in Brighton.

A third series order was announced on 2 March 2017, following strong viewing figures. Scenes were set in Lymington, Hampshire (which substituted for the fictional Middenham and its estuary), Uxbridge, Middlesex, Amersham in Buckinghamshire, Clifton in Bristol, Ealing in West London, and King's Lynn and Hunstanton in Norfolk. An empty mansion at Bulstrode Park near Gerrards Cross, Buckinghamshire provided the setting for the police station and lab. Only seven weeks after filming wrapped, the third series began broadcasting in the UK on 15 July 2018.

A fourth series was scheduled to be made in autumn 2019; however, ITV only confirmed in January 2020 that filming had commenced, with the planned broadcasting timeframe having been delayed. In September 2020, it was announced that filming had recommenced and the series planned on being screened in 2021, with actors Walker, Bhaskar, Reeves and Egan all reprising their roles. The new series eventually began screening in February 2021.

Filming for the fifth series began on 14 March 2022, with the airing of the series due later in 2023.

Episodes

Series overview

Series 1 (2015)

 Episodes 1 – 5's ratings are based on 28-day data from BARB for ITV and ITV+1 and 7-day data for ITV HD. Episode 6's ratings are based on 28-day data from BARB for ITV, ITV+1 and ITV HD.

Series 2 (2017)

Series 3 (2018)

Series 4 (2021)

Series 5 (2023)

International broadcast
Prior to the UK broadcast of the third series, the first series premiered on 8 April 2018 in the United States, as part of PBS Masterpiece Mystery. After two back-to-back episodes were aired each week, the second series was similarly broadcast as three weekly parts from 29 April 2018 to 13 May 2018. Series 3 premiered on 7 April 2019. Series 4 premiered on 11 July 2021.

Home media
The first three series have been released on Region 2 DVD individually. A box-set release of the first two series was made available shortly after the broadcast of the second series. A further box-set release of the first three series came out shortly after the broadcast of the third series. The fourth series has also been released on Region 2 DVD on its own. The first four series have been made available on Amazon Prime in some countries.

Awards and nominations

Remake
In 2017, it was reported that a remake was in development for ABC in the United States, with Josh Berman, Sony Pictures Television and BBC Worldwide Productions producing. Retitled Suspects, it was to feature a new cast and crew. Chris Lang would not be involved in the United States version, and Nicola Walker would not make an appearance.

Notes

References

External links

2015 British television series debuts
2010s British crime drama television series
2010s British mystery television series
2020s British crime drama television series
2020s British mystery television series
English-language television shows
ITV television dramas
Television shows set in London
Television shows set in the United Kingdom